The March of Ukrainian Nationalists is a Ukrainian patriotic song that was originally the official anthem of the Organization of Ukrainian Nationalists and the Ukrainian Insurgent Army. The song is also known by its first line "We were born in a great hour". The song is often referred to as a patriotic song from the times of the uprising, and a Ukrainian folk song. It is still commonly performed today, especially at events honoring the Ukrainian Insurgent Army and by nationalist organizations and party meetings, such as those of VO Svoboda.

Background 

In 1919 with the end of the Polish–Ukrainian War, which resulted in the takeover of western Ukraine by the Second Polish Republic, many former leaders of the Ukrainian republic were exiled. As Polish persecution of Ukrainians during the interwar period increased, many Ukrainians (particularly the youth, many of whom felt they had no future) lost faith in traditional legal approaches, in their elders, and in the western democracies who were seen as turning their backs on Ukraine.  This period of disillusionment coincided with the increase in support for the Organization of Ukrainian Nationalists (OUN).  By the beginning of the Second World War, the OUN was estimated to have 20,000 active members and many times that number in sympathizers. The song was written in 1929 during the midst of these political events and adopted by the organization's leadership 3 years later.

The March of the Ukrainian Nationalists is written and performed as a military march and a call to arms. The first verse of the song refers to "the pain of losing Ukraine", referring to the short-lived independence of the Ukrainian National Republic from 1917-1921. The republic was divided up among the Soviet Union and the Second Polish Republic. The song also mentions a popular Ukrainian national motto, "A United Ukrainian state... from the San to the Caucasus". This is in line with the Ukrainian irredentist concept of having Ukraine's western border start at the San river in modern-day in western Ukraine and southeastern Poland  and its eastern border at the Caucasus Mountains in modern-day Southern Russia.

Lyrics 

Ukrainian lyrics
Зродились ми великої години,
З пожеж війни, із полум’я вогнів,
Плекав нас біль по втраті України,
Кормив нас гнів і злість на ворогів.

І ми йдемо в бою життєвому,
Тверді, міцні, незламні мов граніт,
Бо плач не дав свободи ще нікому,
А хто борець — той здобуває світ.

Не хочемо ні слави ні заплати.
Заплатa нам це радість в боротьбі!
Солодше нам у бою умирати,
як жити в путах, мов німі раби.

Доволі нам руїни і незгоди,
Не сміє брат на брата йти у бій!
Під синьо-жовтим прапором свободи
З'єднаєм весь великий нарід свій.

Велику правду — для усіх єдину,
Наш гордий клич народові несе!
Вітчизні ти будь вірний до загину,
Нам Україна вище понад все!

Веде нас в бій борців упавших слава.
Для нас закон - найвищий то наказ.
"Соборна Українськая держава —
Вільна й міцна, від Сяну по Кавказ".

Ukrainian romanized lyrics
Zrodylys' my velykoi hodyny,
Z pozhezh viyny, iz polum'ia vohniv.
Plekav nas bil' po vtrati Ukrainy,
Kormyv nas hniv i zlist' na vorohiv.

I my ydemo u boiu zhyttievomu,
Tverdi, mitsni, nezlamni mov hranit,
Bo plach ne dav svobody shche nikomu,
A khto borets', toi zdobuvaie svit.

Ne khochemo ni slavy ni zaplaty.
Zaplata nam tse radist' v borot'bi!
Solodshe nam u boiu umyraty,
Jak zhyty v putakh, mov nimi raby.

Dovoli nam, ruiny i nezhody,
Ne smiie brat na brata yti u bii!
Pid syn'o-zhovtym praporom svobody
Z'yednaiem ves' velykyi narid svii.

Velyku pravdu dlia usikh yedynu,
Nash hordyi klych narodovi nese
Vitchyzni ty bud' virnyi do zahynu
Nam Ukraina vyshche ponad vse!

Vede nas v bii bortsiv upavshykh slava.
Dlia nas zakon - naivyshchyi to nakaz.
«Soborna Ukrains'kaia derzhava —
Vil'na i mitsna, vid Sianu po Kavkaz!»

English translation

We were born in a great hour,
From the fires of war, and the flames of gunshots,
We were nurtured by the pain of losing Ukraine,
We were fed by anger and malice to our enemies.

And here we walk in the battle of life -
Solid, durable, unbreakable, like granite,
For crying hasn't given freedom to anyone yet,
But whoever is a fighter, he conquers the world.

We want neither glory, nor payment.
Payment for us - is the luxury of fighting!
It is sweeter for us to die in battle,
Than to live in bondage, as mute slaves.

Enough of ruins and disagreements for us,
A brother will not dare to go to war against a brother!
Under the blue-yellow flag of freedom
We will unite all of our great people.

A united nation one for us all is that one truth
This is our proud call to all people:
Be faithful to your homeland until death,
For us, Ukraine is above all else!

The glory of fallen fighters leads us into battle,
The law is the highest order we shall fulfill.
For a "complete Ukrainian state,
Free and strong, from the San to the Caucasus"!

Modern song 
The March of the New Army is a modern adaptation of the song that is used as a Ukrainian military march as well as nationalist song. A modern text was adopted in 2017 at the initiative of Oleh Skrypka, lead singer of the Ukrainian rock band Vopli Vidopliassova. The new text honors the soldiers of the Armed Forces of Ukraine who fought and died in the Anti-Terrorist Operation Zone during the War in Donbass. According to Skrypka, the text was conceived while at the front in a volunteer unit.

The new march was presented for the first time in early 2017 on the eve of the Ukrainian Volunteer Day, and was performed by Skrypka in cooperation with the Song and Dance Ensemble of the Armed Forces of Ukraine.  On August 24, 2018, the modern version of the song was performed the first time at the Kyiv Independence Day Parade dedicated to the 27th anniversary of independence and the 100th anniversary of the UPR. In his opening address at the parade, President Petro Poroshenko sang an excerpt of the song, describing it as one that "symbolizes the inextricable bond between different generations of fighters for freedom of the homeland."

Modified Lyrics as performed by Vopli Vidopliassova 

When this song was used at the 2018 Independence Day parade, an alternative final line (shown here in italics) was used.

Ukrainian lyrics
Зродились ми великої години,
З пожеж війни і полум’я вогнів.
Плекав нас біль за долю України,
Зростив нас гнів і лють на ворогів.

Ми йдемо в бій переможним ходом,
Тверді й міцні, незламні мов граніт,
Бо плач не дав нікому ще свободи,
Хто борець, той здобуває світ.

Велику суть для усіх єдину,
Наш гордий клич народові несе
Вітчизні будь ти вірний без упину
Нам Україна вище понад все!

Веде нас в бій героїв наших слава.
Для нас закон найвищий то наказ:
«Соборна Українська є держава —
Одна навік: від Сяну по Кавказ!»
Ukrainian romanized lyrics
Zrodylys" my velykoyi hodyny,
Z pozhezh vijny i polum’ya vohniv.
Plekav nas bil" za dolyu Ukrayiny,
Zrostyv nas hniv i lyut" na vorohiv.

My jdemo v bij peremozhnym xodom,
Tverdi, micni, nezlamni, mov hranit,
Bo plach ne dav nikomu shhe svobody,
Xto borec", toj zdobuvaye svit.

Velyku sut" dlya usix yedynu,
Nash hordyj klych narodovi nese
Vitchyzni bud" ty virnyj bez upynu
Nam Ukrayina vyshhe ponad vse!

Vede nas v bij heroyiv nashyx slava.
Dlya nas zakon najvyshhyj to nakaz:
«Soborna Ukrayins"ka ye derzhava —
Odna navik: vid Syanu po Kavkaz!»
English translation
We were born in the great hour,
From the fires of war, and the flames of fire,
We were nurtured for the fate of Ukraine,
We arose with anger and rage against enemies.

We go into battle with a triumphant march,
Solid, strong, unbreakable, like granite,
For crying hasn't given freedom to anyone yet,
Whoever is a fighter, he gains the world.

The great essence for all is uniform,
Our proud call to the people brings:
"Be faithful without cease to the Fatherland,
For us, Ukraine is above all else"!

Glory of our heroes leads us to battle,
And this highest order we shall fulfil -
"For a complete Ukrainian state,
United forever, from the San to the Caucasus!"

Alternative lyrics 

When this song was used at the 2018 Independence Day parade, slightly different lyrics were used.

Ukrainian lyrics
Зродились ми великої години,
З пожеж війни і полум’я вогнів.
Плекав нас біль за долю України,
Зростив нас гнів і лють на ворогів.

Ми йдемо в бій переможним ходом,
Тверді й міцні, незламні мов граніт,
Бо плач не дав нікому ще свободи,
А хто борець, той здобуває світ.

Велику правду для усіх єдину,
Наш гордий клич народові несе
Вітчизні будь ти вірний до загину
Нам Україна вище понад все!

Веде нас в бій героїв наших слава.
Для нас закон найвищий то наказ:
«Соборна Українська є держава —
Одна навік: вона в серцях у нас!»
Ukrainian romanized lyrics
Zrodylys" my velykoyi hodyny,
Z pozhezh vijny i polum’ya vohniv.
Plekav nas bil" za dolyu Ukrayiny,
Zrostyv nas hniv i lyut" na vorohiv.

My jdemo v bij peremozhnym xodom,
Tverdi, micni, nezlamni, mov hranit,
Bo plach ne dav nikomu shhe svobody,
A xto borec", toj zdobuvaye svit.

Velyku pravdu dlya usix yedynu,
Nash hordyj klych narodovi nese
Vitchyzni bud" ty virnyj do zahynu
Nam Ukrayina vyshhe ponad vse!

Vede nas v bij heroyiv nashyx slava.
Dlya nas zakon najvyshhyj to nakaz:
«Soborna Ukrayins"ka ye derzhava —
Odna navik: vona v sercyax u nas!»
English translation
We were born in the great hour,
From the fires of war, and the flames of fire,
We were nurtured for the fate of Ukraine,
We arose with anger and rage against enemies.

We go into battle with a triumphant march,
Solid, strong, unbreakable, like granite,
For crying hasn't given freedom to anyone yet,
But whoever is a fighter, he gains the world.

The great truth for all is uniform,
Our proud call to the people brings:
"Be faithful to your Fatherland unto death,
For us, Ukraine is above all else"!

Glory of our heroes leads us to battle,
And this highest order we shall fulfil -
"For a complete Ukrainian state,
United forever, it is in our hearts!"

See also 
Oh the red viburnum in the meadow
Prayer for Ukraine
State Anthem of Ukraine
Za Ukrainu

References 

1929 songs
Compositions in F minor
March music
Military marches
Organization of Ukrainian Nationalists
Political party songs
Ukrainian songs
Ukrainian folk songs
Ukrainian-language songs
Ukrainian patriotic songs